The 1996–97 Liga Bet season saw Hapoel Majd al-Krum, Maccabi Tur'an, Hapoel Nahlat Yehuda and Maccabi Ashkelon win their regional divisions and promoted to Liga Alef.

At the bottom, Hapoel Bnei Tamra, Maccabi Givat HaRakafot, Maccabi Kabul (from North A division), Hapoel Givat Olga, Maccabi Tzur Shalom, Ironi Sayid Umm al-Fahm (from North B division), Hapoel Mahane Yehuda, Beitar Bat Yam, Beitar Jaffa (from South A division), Beitar Netiv Ashdod and Hapoel Gedera (from South B division) were all automatically relegated to Liga Gimel.

North A division

North B division

South A division

South B division

References
Liga Bet North A IFA 
Liga Bet North B IFA 
Liga Bet South A IFA 
Liga Bet South B IFA 

4
Liga Bet seasons
Israel